This is a list of numbered roads in the United Kingdom and Ireland.

Euroroutes

European routes are not listed or commonly used in the United Kingdom. They are listed and commonly used in the Republic of Ireland.

Motorways

Ireland

Major roads

Great Britain

Northern Ireland
List of A roads in Northern Ireland
Ireland

Minor roads
Great Britain

Northern Ireland
List of B roads in Northern Ireland
Ireland

References

numbered roads in the British Isles
numbered roads in the British Isles
Roads in the United Kingdom
numbered roads in the British Isles
Roads in Ireland
Numbered roads